Estalkh Zir (also Romanized as Esţalkh Zīr; also known as Seleh Cher) is a village in Sheykh Neshin Rural District, Shanderman District, Masal County, Gilan Province, Iran. At the 2006 census, its population was 815, in 218 families.

References 

Populated places in Masal County